WYPX-TV (channel 55) is a television station licensed to Amsterdam, New York, United States, serving the Capital District as an affiliate of Ion Television. Owned by Inyo Broadcast Holdings, the station has offices on Charles Boulevard in Guilderland, and its transmitter is located in the Helderberg Escarpment in New Scotland.

History
The station signed on the air in 1987 as an independent station under the call letters WOCD. It was owned by Amsterdam Broadcasting, a subsidiary of Coit Services of San Francisco, and was leased to Christian Community Television (CCT) of Schenectady, New York. CCT faced financial troubles from the outset and they soon fell behind on their payments, so Amsterdam Broadcasting reassumed control of the station. The station went dormant in 1989, but in 1991, Coit struck a deal to sell the station to Tennessee TV executive Wade Griffith for $1.8 million. Griffith would have relaunched the station as WNSI, but the deal fell through, and WOCD was sold to Cornerstone Television, a religious broadcaster, for $375,000 in 1992. The second incarnation of WOCD had problems getting cable carriage in much of the market which combined with the looming conversion to digital television led the station to be sold again.

In 1997, Paxson Communications bought WOCD from Cornerstone, moved the station's offices from Scotia, New York to Guilderland, and made the station an outlet for the Infomall Television Network (inTV). The call sign was changed to WYPX on January 13, 1998; however, the new calls confused some people as there was a radio station with a similar call sign in the Albany market. WYPX became a charter station for the Pax TV network when it launched on August 31, 1998. WYPX also added a secondary affiliation with UPN on October 5, 1998, airing the network's programming in late night hours following Pax's primetime programming. WVBG-LP (channel 25), a low-power station in Albany, also joined UPN as a primary affiliate the same day; the affiliation deal with WYPX was made before the network agreed to affiliate with WVBG (as Albany had no UPN affiliate at the time, though area cable systems imported WSBK-TV from Boston). WYPX retained its secondary UPN affiliation despite WVBG's affiliation; however, UPN programming disappeared from channel 55 in 1999.

In 2001, WYPX entered into a joint sales agreement with Hubbard Broadcasting, owner of NBC affiliate WNYT (channel 13); under this arrangement, WNYT sold advertising time on WYPX, while WYPX aired replays of WNYT's news and public affairs programming. Paxson terminated all joint sales agreements involving its stations in June 2005 as part of its relaunch of Pax TV as i: Independent Television.

Technical information

Subchannels
The station's digital signal is multiplexed:

Analog-to-digital conversion
WYPX-DT signed on the air on UHF channel 50 and broadcasts at 450 kW from the same transmitter site in early 2005. WYPX-TV requested permission from the FCC to shut down their analog signal on channel 55 so that the bandwidth could be used for Qualcomm's MediaFLO service. Qualcomm had made deals with other stations on channel 55, including WLNY-TV in Riverhead, New York, to shut down analog so that they could launch their new multimedia offering on April 12, 2007. It was granted permission by the FCC to shut down its analog broadcast, surrender its analog license, and operate as a digital-only station on channel 50 on September 6, 2007. The station shut down its analog signal, over UHF channel 55, on September 28, 2007. The station's digital signal remained on its pre-transition UHF channel 50. Through the use of PSIP, digital television receivers display the station's virtual channel as its former UHF analog channel 55, which was among the high band UHF channels (52-69) that were removed from broadcasting use as a result of the transition.

References

External links

Montgomery County, New York
Ion Television affiliates
Bounce TV affiliates
Defy TV affiliates
Court TV affiliates
Grit (TV network) affiliates
TrueReal affiliates
Scripps News affiliates
Television channels and stations established in 1987
1987 establishments in New York (state)
YPX-TV